Higher consciousness is the consciousness of God or, in the words of Dawn DeVries, "the part of the human mind that is capable of transcending animal instincts". While the concept has ancient roots, it was significantly developed in German idealism, and is a central notion in contemporary popular spirituality, including the New Age movement.

Philosophy

Fichte
Johann Gottlieb Fichte (1762–1814) was one of the founding figures of German idealism, which developed from the theoretical and ethical writings of Immanuel Kant. His philosophy forms a bridge between the ideas of Kant and those of the German idealist Georg Wilhelm Friedrich Hegel.

Fichte distinguished the finite or empirical ego from the pure or infinite ego. The activity of this "pure ego" can be discovered by a "higher intuition".

According to Michael Whiteman, Fichte's philosophical system "is a remarkable western formulation of eastern mystical teachings (of Advaita)."

Schopenhauer
In 1812, Arthur Schopenhauer started to use the term "the better consciousness", a consciousness that "lies beyond all experience and thus all reason, both theoretical and practical (instinct)."

According to Yasuo Kamata, Schopenhauer's idea of "the better consciousness" finds its origin in Fichte's idea of a "higher consciousness" (höhere Bewusstsein) or "higher intuition", and also bears resemblance to Schelling's notion of "intellectual intuition". According to Schopenhauer himself, his notion of a "better consciousness" was different from Schelling's notion of "intellectual intuition", since Schelling's notion required intellectual development of the understanding, while his notion of a "better consciousness" was "like a flash of insight, with no connection to the understanding."

According to Schopenhauer,

Main types

Different types of higher states of consciousness can arise individually or in various combinations. The list of known types of higher states of consciousness:

 modified states of consciousness, achieved with the help of meditative psychotechnics;
 optimal experience and the “flow” state;
 euphoria of a runner;
 lucid dreaming;
 out-of-body experience;
 near-death experience;
 mystical experience (sometimes regarded as the highest of all higher states of consciousness)

Religion

Schleiermacher
Friedrich Schleiermacher (1768–1834) made a distinction between lower and higher self-consciousness. In Schleirmacher's theology, self-consciousness contains "a feeling that points to the presence of an absolute other, God, as actively independent of the self and its 'world'." For Schleiermacher, "all particular manifestations of piety share a common essence, the sense of dependency on God as the outside 'infinite'." The feeling of dependency, or "God-consciousness", is a higher form of consciousness. This consciousness is not "God himself", since God would then no longer be "an infinite infinite, but a finite infinite, a mere projection of consciousness."

For Schleiermacher, the lower self-consciousness is "the animal part of mankind", which includes basic sensations such as hunger, thirst, pain and pleasure, as well as basic drives and pleasures, and higher self-consciousness is, in the words of Dawn DeVries, "the part of the human being that is capable of transcending animal instincts", and the "point of contact with God". Bunge describes this as "the essence of being human".

When this consciousness is present, "people are not alienated from God by their instincts". The relation between the lower and the higher consciousness is akin to "Paul's struggle of the spirit to overcome the flesh", or the distinction between the natural and the spiritual side of human beings.

19th-century movements
The idea of a "wider self walled in by the habits of ego-consciousness"  and the search for a "higher consciousness" was manifested in 19th century movements such as Theosophy, New Thought, Christian Science, and Transcendentalism.

The 19th-century Transcendentalists saw the entire physical world as a representation of a higher spiritual world. They believed that humans could elevate themselves above their animal instincts, attain a higher consciousness, and partake in this spiritual world.

According to Blavatsky, who founded the Theosophical Movement,

Blavatsky refers to Fichte in her explanation of Theosophy:

Modern spirituality
The idea of "lower" and "higher consciousness" has gained popularity in modern popular spirituality. According to James Beverley, it lies at the heart of the New Age movement.

Integral theorist Ken Wilber has tried to integrate eastern and western models of the mind, using the notion of "lower" and "higher consciousness". In his book The Spectrum of Consciousness Wilber describes consciousness as a spectrum with ordinary awareness at one end, and more profound types of awareness at higher levels. In later works he describes the development of consciousness as a development from lower consciousness, through personal consciousness, to higher transpersonal consciousness.

Clairvoyant Edgar Cayce referred to higher consciousness as "the Christ pattern". Similarly, channeler Paul Selig refers to it as "Christ consciousness". In Selig's words, this is a "higher energy" at which "You realize that God is the frequency of every cell in your being." This is not necessarily a tenet of Christianity, but the conviction that a regular person can be attuned to reach the same level of spirituality as did the historical Jesus.

Cognitive science
Gerald Edelman, in his 'Theory of Consciousness', distinguishes higher consciousness, or "secondary consciousness" from "primary consciousness", defined as simple awareness that includes perception and emotion. Higher consciousness in contrast, "involves the ability to be conscious of being conscious", and "allows the recognition by a thinking subject of his or her own acts and affections".  Higher consciousness requires, at a minimal level semantic ability, and "in its most developed form, requires linguistic ability, or the  mastery of a whole system of symbols and a grammar".

Psychotropics 

Psychedelic drugs can be used to alter the brain cognition and perception, some believing this to be a state of higher consciousness and transcendence. Typical psychedelic drugs are hallucinogens including LSD, DMT, cannabis, peyote, and psilocybin mushrooms. According to Wolfson, these drug-induced altered states of consciousness may result in a more long-term and positive transformation of self.

According to Dutta, psychedelic drugs may be used for psychoanalytic therapy, as a means to gain access  to the higher consciousness, thereby providing patients the ability to access memories that are held deep within their mind.

See also 
 Ātman (Buddhism)
 Higher Self

Notes

References

Sources

 
 
 Clark, W. H. (1976). Religious Aspects of Psychedelic Drugs. Social Psychology, pp. 86–99.
 
 Dutta, V. (2012, July–September). Repression of Death Consciousness and the Psychedelic Trip. Journal of Cancer Research and Therapeutics, pp. 336–342.
 
 
 
 
 Johanson, P., & Krebs, T. S. (2013, August). Psychedelics and Mental Health: A population study. PLOS ONE.
 
 Lerner, M. M. (2006, June). Values and Beliefs of Psychedelic Drug Users: A Cross Cultural Study. Volume 38, pp. 143–147.
 
 Stasko, A., Rao, S. P., & Pilley, A. (2012). Spirituality and Hallucinogen Use: Results from a pilot study among college students. International Journal of Transpersonal Studies, 23–32.
 Tart, C. T., & Davis, C. (1991). Psychedelic Drug Experiences on Students of Tibetan Buddhism, A preliminary Exploration. The Journal of Transpersonal Psychology, 139-173
 
 
 Wolfson, P (2011) Tikkun January/February Vol. 26 Issue 1, p10, 6p

Further reading
Classical Western texts
 
 

Secondary sources
 
 
 

Contemporary spirituality (primary sources)
 The Degrees of The Soul, Shaykh Abd Al-Khaliq Al-Shabrawi, Quilliam Press
 The Dhammapada, trans. Harischandra Kaviratna, Online Version
 Discourses of Rumi (Fihi Ma Fihi), trans. A.J. Arberry, Online Version
 Edge of Reality, Dawn Hill. Pan Books, Sydney 1987. 
 The Evolution of Consciousness, Robert Ornstein
 The Psychology of Man's Possible Evolution, P.D. Ouspensky, Online Version
 Shambhala, Chogyam Trungpa, Shambhala
 We are all One: A call to spiritual uprising'', J.M.Harrison , A.Lawren O'Lee Publications

External links

Spirituality
New Thought beliefs   
Consciousness